The United Nations Educational, Scientific and Cultural Organization (UNESCO) designates World Heritage Sites of outstanding universal value to cultural or natural heritage which  have been nominated by countries which are signatories to the UNESCO World Heritage Convention, established in 1972. Cultural heritage consists of monuments (such as architectural works, monumental sculptures, or inscriptions), groups of buildings, and sites (including archaeological sites). Natural features (consisting of physical and biological formations), geological and physiographical formations (including habitats of threatened species of animals and plants), and natural sites which are important from the point of view of science, conservation or natural beauty, are defined as natural heritage. The Republic of Cyprus accepted the convention on 14 August 1975, making its sites eligible for inclusion on the list.

, there are three World Heritage Sites in Cyprus, all of which are cultural sites. The first site to be listed was Paphos in 1980. In 1985, the Painted Churches in the Troodos Region were listed. The original nomination included nine churches, an additional one was added to the site in 2001. The most recent site added to the list was Choirokoitia in 1998 (with a minor boundary modification taking place in 2012).  In 2010, all three sites in Cyprus were given enhanced protection status by the Committee for the Protection of Cultural Property in the Event of Armed Conflict. In addition, Cyprus also maintains eleven properties on its tentative list, six of which are associated with the Troodos Ophiolite.



World Heritage Sites 
UNESCO lists sites under ten criteria; each entry must meet at least one of the criteria. Criteria i through vi are cultural, and vii through x are natural.

Tentative list
In addition to the sites inscribed on the World Heritage List, member states can maintain a list of tentative sites that they may consider for nomination. Nominations for the World Heritage List are only accepted if the site was previously listed on the tentative list. , Cyprus recorded eleven sites on its tentative list.

See also
Tourism in Cyprus

References

 
World Heritage Sites
Cyprus
World Heritage Sites